Munro's Books is a large independent bookstore in Victoria, British Columbia, Canada. Munro's has a staff of 30 and a large children's book section. The store celebrated its 50th anniversary in September 2013.

Since 1984, the store has been located in downtown Victoria in a neo-classical building (Royal Bank Building) with a  coffered ceiling, designed in 1909 for the Royal Bank of Canada by architect Thomas Hooper. Munro's Books has been described by journalist Allan Fotheringham as "the most magnificent bookstore in Canada, possibly in North America."

The store was founded in 1963 by Jim Munro and his first wife Alice Munro, the 2013 Nobel Prize-winning short-story writer; at the start, its stock was mostly paperbacks. According to Jim Munro, Alice Munro began to write after reading some of the bookstore's stock and deciding angrily that "I can write better books than this." Although Alice Munro has not had any relation to the bookstore for decades, the store still receives fan and press calls asking for her.

Textile artist Carole Sabiston, Jim Munro's second wife, created the tapestries that decorate the bookstore.

See also
 Russell Books

References

External links

Munro's Books official website

Independent bookstores of Canada
Shops in Victoria, British Columbia
Retail companies established in 1963
1963 establishments in British Columbia
Canadian companies established in 1963